Bahruz Shirali bey oglu Kangarli (22 January 1892, Nakhchivan – 7 February 1922, Nakhchivan) was an Azerbaijani painter and graphic artist. He was one of the first professional representatives of Azerbaijani visual arts and was the founder of realistic easel painting of Azerbaijan.

Biography
Bahruz Kangarli was born on 22 January 1892 in Nakhchivan. He was hard of hearing due to an illness as a child, which is why he could not attend a comprehensive secondary school and was instead homeschooled. In 1910, he went to Tiflis with the support of Jalil Mammadguluzadeh and entered the Tiflis School of Arts under the Society of Encouragement of Fine Arts, where Otto Schmerling and Yeghishe Tadevosyan taught at that time. He painted portraits of Schmerling and his colleague Lado Gudiashvili while he studied there. Various satirical magazines published in Russia in the prerevolutionary period, especially Molla Nasraddin magazine of Baku published Kangarli's works, next to caricatures by Schmerling and satirical paintings of Azim Azimzade, whom Kangarli was inspired by. He returned to Nakhchivan after graduating from the School of Arts in 1916. The landscape genre took up a great place in his creativity. Kangarli's watercolor paintings depicting the nature of his native land include "Waterfall", "Agridag", "The road in Yakhshan village", "Ilanly mountain under the moonlight", "Russian church in Nakhchivan", "Before rising time of the Sun", and "Spring". Monuments of culture were portrayed in his landscapes "Momine Khatun Mausoleum", "Ashabi-kahf Mountain", and "Prophet Noah's grave". Compositions "Matchmaking", "Wedding" and also artworks and costume sketches for the theatrical plays The Deadmen (by Jalil Mammadguluzade), Haji Gara (by Mirza Fatali Akhundov), Pari-jadu (by Abdurrahim bey Hagverdiyev) and other plays staged in Nakhchivan are examples of Azerbaijani art of the time.

Kangarli also created portraits of his contemporaries ("An old man", "A Georgian"), and a series of paintings called "Refugees" ("Refugee-lady", "Refugee-boy", "Refugee-woman", and "Homeless family").

Kangarli's album called "Memories of Nakhchivan" with his 20 landscapes is currently kept in the Azerbaijan State Museum of Art. He was known to hold exhibitions of his paintings in his own house, with free entrance.

Kangarli also drew portraits of Karl Marx and Friedrich Engels during the first months of the Soviet rule. Kangarli exhibited more than 500 works painted by him at the first exhibition organized with Revcom's assistance, in 1921, in Azerbaijan. This exhibition was of great importance to him, and Kangarli donated one third of the money raised to an orphanage. Kangarli left an artistic legacy of more than 2000 artworks created during his short creative activity of seven years. On 22 May 2007 Kangarli's home-museum was established in Nakhchivan, and a monument was erected on his grave.

Gallery

See also
Bahruz Kangarli Museum

References

1892 births
People from Nakhchivan
1922 deaths
Azerbaijani portrait painters
20th-century Azerbaijani painters